João Gonçalves Laranjeira (born 28 September 1951 in Lisbon) is a former Portuguese footballer who played for Sporting, Benfica and Amora F.C. in the Portuguese Liga, as central defender.

Laranjeira gained 12 caps for the Portugal national team

External links 
 
 

1951 births
Living people
Footballers from Lisbon
Sporting CP footballers
S.L. Benfica footballers
Portugal international footballers
Portuguese footballers
Primeira Liga players
Association football defenders